recognizes and honors an individual or group of digital content creators for their outstanding works or services that have been released or presented in the past year.

Overview 
The AMD Award is sponsored by the Ministry of Internal Affairs and Communications and implemented by the Association of Media in Digital. The awards are given to digital content that has contributed to the development of the Japanese content industry during the previous year. The awards have been given to a wide range of activities including movies, animation, games, music, artists, and services.

Recipients

References

External links 

 Association of Media in Digital

Mass media awards